Matsubara (written ) is a Japanese surname. Notable people with the surname include:

, Japanese women's footballer
, Japanese footballer
, Japanese writer
, Japanese politician
, Japanese footballer
, Japanese marine biologist
, Japanese handball player
, Japanese sport wrestler
, Japanese singer-songwriter and composer
, Japanese artist
, Japanese businessman
, Japanese rhythmic gymnast
, Japanese footballer
, Japanese politician
, Japanese physicist
, Japanese singer and actor
, Japanese footballer
, Japanese footballer

Japanese-language surnames